Dramane Salou (born 22 May 1998) is a Burkinabé footballer, who plays as a defensive midfielder. He debuted for Burkina Faso national football team in 2017.

Club career
Born in Ouagadougou, Salou has started his career with the local football club Salitas. Having played with academy until 2016, Salou was loaned to US des Forces Armées for the 2016–17 Burkinabé Premier League campaign, where he made his first appearances in the top tier of the Burkinabé football pyramid. Returning from loan deal, Salou joined the first team of his home club, Salitas, which was promoted to the top level league previously. Scoring 3 goals and making 5 assists, he was elected for the best footballer in the domestic competition in November 2017. Thus he received 100k CFA as a reward.

Passing a trial period with the club at the beginning of 2018, Salou signed a four-year contract with the Serbian SuperLiga side Partizan on 1 February same year. In summer 2018, Salou moved on loan to the satellite club, Teleoptik, for the 2018–19 Serbian First League campaign. After a year and a half, Partizan decided to terminate the cooperation with Salou without making his debut for the club in any official competition.

On 15 August 2020, FC Pyunik announced the signing of Salou from Slutsk.

On 20 February 2022, Salou returned to Armenia, singing of FC Noah. On 7 February 2023, Salou terminated his contract with Noah by mutual agreement.

International career
Salou was a member of youth national team, being elected in a group of players, available to play in 2017 Africa U-20 Cup of Nations qualification. Following the games in top tier Burkinabé league, Salou was called into the Burkina Faso national football team, making an official debut in 1–1 friendly draw to Benin on 4 May 2017.

Playing style
Standing at 5-foot-9-inches (1.75 m), Salou mainly operates as a defensive midfielder. Although he was "strictly defensive oriented" in early years of his career due to insufficient of weight and stamina, while growing, he has converted in more offensive midfielder. Playing in the Burkinabé Premier League, Salou affirmed himself as an assistant and goal poacher, which put him among the most prospective players in the competition.

Career statistics

Club

International

Honours
Salitas
 Coupe du Faso: 2018

Partizan
 Serbian Cup: 2018

References

External links
 
 

1998 births
Living people
Sportspeople from Ouagadougou
Association football midfielders
Burkinabé footballers
Burkina Faso international footballers
US des Forces Armées players
FK Partizan players
FK Teleoptik players
Serbian First League players
Burkinabé expatriate footballers
Expatriate footballers in Serbia
Salitas FC players
FC Olimpik Donetsk players
Ukrainian Premier League players
Expatriate footballers in Ukraine
Burkinabé expatriate sportspeople in Ukraine
FC Slutsk players
FC Pyunik players
FC Noah players
Belarusian Premier League players
Expatriate footballers in Belarus
Expatriate footballers in Armenia
21st-century Burkinabé people
Burkina Faso under-20 international footballers